Mau Mau Maria is a 2014 Portuguese comedy film directed by José Alberto Pinheiro. It was released on 30 October 2014.

Cast
Débora Monteiro
Diana Chaves
Inês Aires Pereira
São José Correia
Inês Castel-Branco
Victor de Sousa
José Pedro Gomes
António Raminhos
Eduardo Madeira
Marco Horácio
Margarida Moreira
Rita Camarneiro
Rui Reininho

Reception
The film earned €267,410.29 at the Portuguese box office, and had 51,799 admissions. As of 11 January 2015, it was the 5th highest-grossing Portuguese film of 2014 at the Portuguese box office and, as of 14 January 2015, it was the 19th highest-grossing Portuguese film at the Portuguese box office since 2004.

On Público, Luís Miguel Oliveira gave the film a grade of "bad".

References

External links

2014 comedy films
Portuguese comedy films
2010s Portuguese-language films